Batocera bruyni is a species of beetle in the family Cerambycidae. It was described by Lansborough in 1880. It is known from Sulawesi.

References

Batocerini
Beetles described in 1880